Ratoszyn Pierwszy  is a village in the administrative district of Gmina Chodel, within Opole Lubelskie County, Lublin Voivodeship, in eastern Poland.

The village has a population of 460 residents.

References

Ratoszyn Pierwszy